Judgment notwithstanding the verdict, also called judgment non obstante veredicto, or JNOV, is a type of judgment as a matter of law that is sometimes rendered at the conclusion of a jury trial. In U.S. federal civil court cases, the term has been replaced by the renewed judgment as a matter of law, which emphasizes its relationship to the judgment as a matter of law, formerly called a directed verdict. In U.S. federal criminal cases, the term is "judgment of acquittal".

In American courts, JNOV is the practice whereby the presiding judge in a civil jury trial may overrule the decision of a jury and reverse or amend their verdict. In literal terms, the judge enters a judgment notwithstanding the jury verdict. The rarely-granted intervention permits the judge to exercise discretion to avoid extreme and unreasonable jury decisions.

A judge may not enter a JNOV of "guilty" following a jury acquittal in United States criminal cases. Such an action would violate a defendant's Fifth Amendment right not to be placed in double jeopardy and Sixth Amendment right to a trial by jury. If the judge grants a motion to set aside judgment after the jury convicts, however, the action may be reversed on appeal by the prosecution.

A JNOV is appropriate only if the judge determines that no reasonable jury could have reached the given verdict. For example, if a party enters no evidence on an essential element of his case but the jury still finds in his favor, the court may rule that no reasonable jury would have disregarded the lack of evidence on that key point and reform the judgment.

The reversal of a jury's verdict by a judge occurs when the judge believes that there were insufficient facts on which to base the jury's verdict or that the verdict did not correctly apply the law. That procedure is similar to a situation in which a judge orders a jury to arrive at a particular verdict, called a directed verdict. A judgment notwithstanding the verdict is occasionally made when a jury refuses to follow a judge's instruction to arrive at a certain verdict.

See also

 Jury nullification

References 

Law of the United States